Oestrich-Winkel is a town with roughly 12,000 inhabitants in the Rheingau-Taunus-Kreis in the Regierungsbezirk of Darmstadt in Hesse, Germany.

Geography

Location 
Oestrich-Winkel, which culturally belongs to the Rheingau region, lies on the Rhine River, 19 km west-southwest of Wiesbaden and 17 km west of Mainz. It is, as a part of the Rheingau wine region, the largest winegrowing town of Hesse.

The coordinates 50°N, 8°E lie right in the stadtteil of Winkel, whose name, coincidentally, is German for “angle”.

Neighbouring municipalities 
Oestrich-Winkel borders in the north on the town of Lorch and the municipalities of Welterod (Rhein-Lahn-Kreis in Rhineland-Palatinate), Heidenrod and Schlangenbad; in the east on the town of Eltville; in the south, across the Rhine, on the town of Ingelheim (Mainz-Bingen district in Rhineland-Palatinate) and in the west on the town of Geisenheim.

Territorial structure 
Oestrich-Winkel as a municipality consists of four Stadtteile:
 Hallgarten
 Mittelheim
 Oestrich (seat of municipal administration)
 Winkel
Hallgarten as the only one of these has the status as an Ortsbezirk.

History 
Oestrich-Winkel was founded on the 1st of July, 1972 by the merger of the municipalities of Mittelheim, Oestrich and Winkel; it was further enlarged by incorporation of Hallgarten in 1977 by law. From the very beginning Oestrich-Winkel was entitled by state government to lead the designation Stadt (town).

The double-barrelled name Oestrich-Winkel has already had a long tradition as the name of the only train station for the East Rhine Railway between Geisenheim and Hattenheim.

Politics

Mayors
Kay Tenge (CDU) was elected in 2019 for mayor. Former mayors were:
2013–2019: Michael Heil (CDU)
1995–2013: Paul Weimann (CDU)
1989–1995: Heinz-Dieter Mielke (SPD)
1972–1989: Klaus Frietsch (SPD)

Town council 
The last municipal elections, taking place every five years, yielded the following results:

Town partnerships 
The town of Oestrich-Winkel maintains partnerships with the following two places and one military unit:
 Tokaj, Borsod-Abaúj-Zemplén County, Hungary
 Denicé, Rhône, France
 2./ Fernmeldebataillon 283 (roughly, “signal corps”) in Lahnstein.

Coat of arms 
The town's arms might be described thus: Gules a Z reversed with cross stroke argent between two mullets of six Or.

The Z is a variant of a common German heraldic charge known in German as a Wolfsangel or Doppelhaken, and its appearance here apparently refers to its use for dealing with wolves in earlier times (the Wolfsangel is believed to have been used as a wolf trap). The arms themselves go back to the 17th century.

Culture and sightseeing

Wine culture 

Oestrich-Winkel is characterized by winegrowing. The following places are cultivated:

 Oestrich: Lenchen, Doosberg, Klosterberg, Pfaffenberg
 Mittelheim: Edelmann, St. Nikolaus, Goldberg
 Winkel: Dachsberg, Hasensprung, Gutenberg, Jesuitengarten, Bienengarten, Schloß Vollrads
 Hallgarten: Jungfer, Würzgarten, Schönhell, Hendelberg, Mehrhölzchen

Sightseeing 
The Oestricher Kran, Oestrich-Winkel's main landmark, is a former wine-loading crane from the 18th century for loading and unloading ships. Completed in 1745, it was working until 1926. Inside the crane are two treadmills in each of which two men used their body weight to work a winch, which could then lift loads onto or off ships. It is the last preserved wine-loading crane on the Rhine's right bank. There were once also such cranes in Lorch, Eltville and Rüdesheim. These cranes can still be found in existence along the Rhine at Andernach (stone; loaded tuff, millstones and wine barrels) and Bingen (wood, loaded mainly wine barrels).

In Mittelheim is found one of Germany's oldest stone churches, St.-Aegidius-Basilika (“Saint Giles’s Basilica”).

In Winkel stands Germany's oldest stone house, the Graues Haus (“Grey House”). For a long time it was believed that Rabanus Maurus lived and in 856 died there. Schloss Vollrads, outside Winkel, with its ancient watertower likewise belongs among the noteworthy sights. On the town's northeast limit near Hattenheim stands Schloss Reichartshausen (founded in the 12th century) with its outbuildings, which about 1900 were remodelled to look like follies. It nowadays houses the European Business School. In the middle of the community stands the Brentanohaus. Here, Goethe spent some time in 1814 as a guest of the Frankfurt banking family Brentano. The family's children were Clemens, Gunda and Bettina Brentano. Karoline von Günderrode, a poet and one of Bettina's friends, stabbed herself here in Winkel in 1806 on the Rhine's bank out of lovesickness and life weariness. Since 2003, the barn across from the Brentanohaus has hosted the cultural and event venue Brentanoscheune (Scheune means “barn”).

Regular events 
These include the Lenchenfest (a wine festival), the Dippemarkt (a market with a funfair the Christmas market (Weihnachtsmarkt) and Jazz Week (Jazzwoche).

Rheingau Musik Festival
The Rheingau Musik Festival has its office in Oestrich in a former winery, the presshouse (Kelterhalle) converted to a hall for intimitate concerts and events. Festival concerts have taken place in the basilica St. Aegidius, such as a recital of Elisabeth Scholl.

Economy and infrastructure

Education 
Since 1980 Oestrich-Winkel has been the seat of the EBS Universität für Wirtschaft und Recht. Further educational institutions are, among others, the Clemens-Brentano-Schule (primary school and Hauptschule), the Rabanus-Maurus-Schule (primary school and Hauptschule with orientation level) and Hallgarten primary school.

Transport 
Oestrich-Winkel lies right on Bundesstraße 42, which is particularly well developed towards the east, and which seamlessly feeds into the A 66 near Wiesbaden. The town lies on the Frankfurt am Main–Wiesbaden–Oestrich-Winkel–Koblenz railway line and belongs to the Rhein-Main-Verkehrsverbund. Furthermore, between 6:00 and 21:00, a ferry shuttles across the Rhine between Mittelheim and Ingelheim, where there is a link with the A 60.

Famous people

Sons and daughters of the town 
Richard von Greiffenklau zu Vollrads (1467–1531), Archbishop and Elector of Trier, was born at Schloss Vollrads
Peter Spahn (1846–1925), German politician (ZENTRUM), Member of the Reichstag, Member of the Landtag (Prussia), Prussian Justice Minister, was born in Winkel

Others with links to the town 

 Rabanus Maurus (d. 856), important Carolingian academic, died in Winkel
 Karoline von Günderrode (1780–1806), Romantic poet, committed suicide in Winkel
Andreas Joseph Hofmann, (1752-1849), Metternich's teacher, revolutionary, France's agent in London, and in 1793 German history's first Parliamentary president in the Rhenish-German National Convention

References

External links 

  
 Historisches Ortslexikon

Documents 
Bild von Oestrich aus J.F. Dielmann, A. Fay, J. Becker (Zeichner): F.C. Vogels Panorama des Rheins, Bilder des rechten und linken Rheinufers, Lithographische Anstalt F.C. Vogel, Frankfurt 1833
Bild von Mittelheim aus J.F. Dielmann, A. Fay, J. Becker (Zeichner): F.C. Vogels Panorama des Rheins, Bilder des rechten und linken Rheinufers, Lithographische Anstalt F.C. Vogel, Frankfurt 1833

Populated places on the Rhine
Rheingau-Taunus-Kreis
Rheingau